Erkan Ergen is a Turkish Greco-Roman wrestler competing in the 77 kg division. He is a member of Bursa BBSK.

Career 

Erkan Ergen captured bronze medal in men's Greco-Roman 77 kg at 2021 European Wrestling Championships.

References

External links 
 

Living people
Turkish male sport wrestlers
1998 births